Wings of Desire is the fifth studio album by American singer Jennifer Rush, released in November 1989.

Background
After working mainly with American writers and producers for her last two albums, Rush decided to bring her music back to Europe and collaborated with producers Christopher Neil, Phil Ramone and others, including a song ("Angel") co-written by ABBA affiliate Tomas Ledin.

Commercial performance
Wings of Desire failed to sell as well as Rush's earlier albums, although it did make the top 20 in Germany, Sweden and Switzerland. In her biggest market, Germany, the album remained in the chart for 20 weeks. In the UK the album was released in April 1990 with the lead single "Higher Ground". It failed to chart highly in the UK despite her scoring a hit with "Till I Loved You" the previous year.

The title track "Wings of Desire" was released as a second single in 1990.

Track listing 
Writers in the 'Music' column are the same as those in the 'Lyrics' column unless otherwise stated.

Personnel
Bass: Adrian Lee (1), Peter Adams (2), Robbie Buchanan (5)
Drums: Adrian Lee (1), Peter Van Hooke (2), Eric Rehl (3, 6-8), David LeBolt (4), Robbie Buchanan (5), Sammy Merendino (10)
Guitar: Adrian Lee (1), Carlos Alomar (3-4, 6-8, 10), Michael Landau (5), Michael J. Powell (9, 11), Donnie Lyle (9, 11)
Keyboards: Adrian Lee (1), Peter Adams (2), Eric Rehl (3, 6-10), David LeBolt (4), Robbie Buchanan (5), Vernon D. Fails (9, 11)
Saxophone: Bobby Stern (8-10)
Percussion: Bashiri Johnson (3-4, 6-11)

Backing Vocals: Alan Clavell (1), Christopher Neil (1), Linda Taylor (2), Stevie Blue (4, 6-8, 10), Jennifer Rush (4, 7-10), Dorianne Elliot (4, 6), Karen Kamon (4, 6-8, 10), Paulette McWilliams (4, 6), Mark Hudson (5), Dawn Feusi (5), Lise Miller (5), Robin Clark (6), Mark Radice (7-8, 10), Diva Gray (7-8, 10), Valerie Pinkston-Mayo (9), Kim Edwards-Brown (9), Fred White (9), Franke Previte (10), The New Jersey Mass Choir (10)

Charts

Certifications

References

External links

1989 albums
Jennifer Rush albums
Albums produced by Christopher Neil
Albums produced by Phil Ramone
Columbia Records albums